Swallowfield Meadow is a   Local Nature Reserve in Swallowfield, south of Reading in Berkshire. It is owned and managed by Swallowfield Parish Council.

Geography and site

The reserve features meadows, native hedgerows, a small copse, ditches, and seasonal ponds as well as the meadows themselves.

History

The area that is now the meadow was transferred to the Parish Council in the mid-1990s when houses were being built in the village.  Before then the area had been a coal yard.

On 15 July 2003, the area was officially designated as a Local Nature Reserve.

Fauna

The site has the following fauna:

Mammals

European water vole

Flora

The site has the following flora:

Trees

Betula pendula
Acer campestre
Corylus avellana

Plants

Leucanthemum vulgare
Knautia arvensis

References

Parks and open spaces in Berkshire
Nature reserves in Berkshire
Local Nature Reserves in Berkshire
Swallowfield